The NWF World Tag Team Championship was the top tag team championship in the National Wrestling Federation from 1970 to 1974, the entire life of the promotion.

Title history

Footnotes

References

National Wrestling Federation championships
Tag team wrestling championships